Cambridge Zen Center is an urban meditation center in Cambridge, Massachusetts, close to Harvard University, part of the Kwan Um School of Zen. Free meditation training and dharma talks are offered to the public and  the Zen Center also provides a large (30-35 people) residential training program.

Gallery

See also
 Providence Zen Center
 Chogye International Zen Center
 Timeline of Zen Buddhism in the United States

References

External links
Cambridge Zen Center official site
Kwan Um School of Zen

Buddhism in Massachusetts
Zen centers in the United States
Kwan Um School of Zen
Buddhist temples in Massachusetts
Religious organizations established in 1973
Buildings and structures in Cambridge, Massachusetts